Attilio Ferraris (26 March 1904 – 8 May 1947) was an Italian footballer who played as a defensive midfielder.

Club career
Ferraris played ten seasons (254 games, two goals) in the Serie A, for A.S. Roma, S.S. Lazio and A.S. Bari.

International career
With the Italy national team, Ferraris won the bronze medal at the 1928 Olympics, but he did not play in any matches. He was playing in the 1927–30 Central European International Cup winning gold & in the 1931–32 Central European International Cup winning silver.

He was also a very important part of the World Cup winning team of 1934, making it to the tournament's All-Star Team for his performances.

Ferraris died in 1947 after collapsing while playing in an old-timers' match.

Honours
Italy
FIFA World Cup: 1934
Central European International Cup: 1927–30
Central European International Cup: Runner-up: 1931–32
Summer Olympics: Bronze 1928

Individual
FIFA World Cup Team of the Tournament: 1934
A.S. Roma Hall of Fame: 2013

References

External links
 

1904 births
1947 deaths
Association football players who died while playing
Footballers from Rome
Italian footballers
Association football midfielders
A.S. Roma players
S.S. Lazio players
S.S.C. Bari players
Catania S.S.D. players
Serie A players
Serie B players
Italy international footballers
Olympic footballers of Italy
Footballers at the 1928 Summer Olympics
Olympic bronze medalists for Italy
1934 FIFA World Cup players
FIFA World Cup-winning players
Olympic medalists in football
Medalists at the 1928 Summer Olympics
Sport deaths in Italy